On 8 November 1940, a Deutsche Lufthansa Junkers Ju 90 passenger aircraft crashed near the municipality of Schönteichen, Germany, killing all 29 people on board.

The aircraft, registered D-AVMF and named Brandenburg, was en route from the German capital Berlin to Budapest, Hungary when ice formed on its tail, causing the airplane to lose control and crash. At the time, the accident was the worst one on German soil.

References

1940 in Germany
Aviation accidents and incidents in 1940
Airliner accidents and incidents caused by ice
Aviation accidents and incidents in Germany
20th century in Saxony